St. Mark's Church in-the-Bowery is a parish of the Episcopal Church located at 131 East 10th Street, at the intersection of Stuyvesant Street and Second Avenue in the East Village neighborhood of Manhattan in New York City. The property has been the site of continuous Christian worship for more than three and a half centuries, making it New York City's oldest site of continuous religious practice. The structure is the second-oldest church building in Manhattan.

In 2020, it reported 103 members, average attendance of 67, and $142,197 in plate and pledge income.

History and architecture
In 1651, Petrus Stuyvesant, Director General of New Netherland, purchased land for a bowery or farm from the Dutch West India Company and by 1660 built a family chapel at the present day site of St. Mark's Church. Stuyvesant died in 1672 and was interred in a vault under the chapel.

Stuyvesant's great-grandson, Petrus "Peter" Stuyvesant, sold the chapel property to the Episcopal Church for $1 in 1793, stipulating that a new chapel be erected to serve Bowery Village, the community which had coalesced around the Stuyvesant family chapel. In 1795 the cornerstone of the present day St. Mark's Church was laid, and the fieldstone Georgian style church, built by the architect and mason John McComb Jr., was completed and consecrated on May 9, 1799. Alexander Hamilton provided legal aid in incorporating St. Mark's Church as the first Episcopal parish independent of Trinity Church in New York City. By 1807 the church had as many as two hundred worshipers at its summer services, with 70 during the winter.

In 1828, the church steeple, the design of which is attributed to Martin Euclid Thompson and Ithiel Town, in Greek Revival style, was erected. More changes came about beginning in 1835, when John C. Tucker's stone Parish Hall was constructed, and the next year (1836) the church itself was renovated, with the original square pillars being replaced with thinner ones in Egyptian Revival style. In addition, the current cast- and wrought iron fence was added in 1838; these renovations are credited to Thompson. At around the same time, the two-story fieldstone Sunday School was completed, and the church established the Parish Infant School for poor children.

Later, in 1861, the church commissioned a brick addition to the Parish Hall, which was designed and supervised by architect James Renwick Jr., and the St. Mark's Hospital Association was organized by members of the congregation. Outside the church, the cast iron portico, was added around 1858; its design is attributed to James Bogardus, who was an early innovator in cast iron construction.

At the start of the 20th century, leading architect Ernest Flagg designed the rectory. Overall, while the 19th century saw St. Mark's Church grow through its many construction projects, the 20th century was marked by community service and cultural expansion.

In 1966, the Poetry Project and The Film Project, which later became the Millennium Film Workshop, were founded. Furthermore, in 1975, the Danspace Project was founded by Larry Fagin; the Community Documentation Workshop under the direction of Arthur Tobier was established; and the Preservation Youth Project expanded to a full-time work training program, which undertook the mission of the preserving St Mark's landmark exterior under the supervision of artisan teachers. On July 27, 1978, a fire nearly destroyed the church. The Citizens to Save St Mark's was founded to raise funds for its reconstruction and the Preservation Youth Project undertook the reconstruction supervised by architect Harold Edelman and craftspeople provided by preservation contractor I. Maas & Sons. The Landmark Fund emerged from the Citizens to Save St Mark's and continues to exist to help maintain and preserve St. Mark's Church for future generations. The restoration was completed in 1986, with new stained-glass windows designed by Edelman.

Usage

Rector William Guthrie was known to incorporate Native American, Hindu, Buddhist, and Bahá'í ceremonies and guest speakers into services.

Today, the rectory houses the Neighborhood Preservation Center, the Greenwich Village Society for Historic Preservation and the Historic Districts Council, as well as other preservation and community organizations such as the Poetry Project, the Millennium Film Workshop, and the Danspace Project.

Over the years, several Dutch dignitaries visited the church while they were in the United States. In 1952, Queen Juliana of the Netherlands visited the church and laid a wreath given by her mother, Queen Wilhelmina, at the bust of Petrus Stuyvesant, which had been given to the church by Wilhelmina and the Dutch government in 1915. Later, in 1981 and 1982, Princess Margriet and Queen Beatrix, both of the Netherlands, also visited.

The arts
St Mark's has supported an active artistic community since the 19th century.

In 1919 poet Kahlil Gibran was appointed a member of the St. Mark's Arts Committee, and the next year, the two prominent Indian statues, "Aspiration" and "Inspiration" by sculptor Solon Borglum, which flank the church entry, were unveiled. Gibran also presented readings of his famous written works, some of which became annual affairs for a while, as well as an exhibition of his drawings. Isadora Duncan danced in the church in 1922, and Martha Graham in 1930. In 1926, poet William Carlos Williams lectured at the St. Mark's Sunday Symposium, which over the years featured such artists as Amy Lowell, Edward Steichen, Houdini, Edna St. Vincent Millay, Ruth St. Denis and Carl Sandburg.

Starting in 1955, the Lower East Side artists' held an annual exhibition during the summer at St. Mark's. It was an inclusive, non-juried group exhibition that featured hundreds of artists from the neighborhood and utilized both the interior spaces and the yard.

Theatre Genesis was founded by director Ralph Cook in 1964 and, in the same year, Sam Shepard had his first two plays, Cowboys and Rock Garden produced at the church. In 1969, St. Mark's innovated a fusion of liturgy and experimental rock music, the Electric Liturgy given by the Mind Garage, which was the first work of its kind to be nationally televised.

St. Mark's hosts modern artistic endeavors, including the Poetry Project, and Danspace Project, which stage events throughout the year.  A November 1971 Poetry Project reading by Patti Smith, accompanied by Lenny Kaye on guitar, launched their rock and roll careers and marked the founding of the Patti Smith Group.

In addition, Richard Foreman's avant-garde Ontological-Hysteric Theater was also housed there in its own space from 1992 until 2010.

Notable burials

Both the church's East and West Yards have under them stone burial vaults, in which many prominent New Yorkers were interred. Although it no longer does full body burials, the church still does cremation burials in the church vault under the West Yard.

 Charles Anthon – scholar of the classics
 Joseph S. Brasuell - Lower East Side community leader who served as warden and vestry member of the Church
 John C. Colt – convicted murderer and brother of Samuel Colt – of Colt Revolver fame – was interred in 1842 after his suicide in The Tombs jail.
 Miriam Friedlander (1914-2009) – was a Bronx born American politician who represented the city council district in New York City's Lower East Side and Chinatown from 1974 to 1991.
 Augustus van Horne Ellis – lawyer, sea captain, and a brevet brigadier general in the Union Army during the Civil War; killed in action at the Battle of Gettysburg
 Thomas Addis Emmet – lawyer and politician who served as New York State Attorney General
 Nicholas Fish (1758–1833) – Revolutionary War soldier, who later served as adjutant general of New York State; father of New York Governor and United States Senator Hamilton Fish (1808–1893).
 Josiah Ogden Hoffman – lawyer and politician
 Philip Hone (1780–1851) – merchant and Mayor of New York.
 John Brooks Leavitt – attorney, Senior Warden of St. Mark's
 Gideon Lee (1778–1841) – Mayor of New York and United States Representative.
 Commodore Matthew C. Perry – famous for his role in the "opening" of Japan; his body was later moved to Island Cemetery in Newport, Rhode Island.
 Alexander Turney Stewart (1803–1876) – wealthy New York merchant, whose body was stolen two years after his burial and held for ransom.
 Peter Stuyvesant (1612–1672) – Director-General of the Dutch colony of New Amsterdam.
 Daniel D. Tompkins (1774–1825) – Vice President of the United States under President James Monroe and former Governor of New York.

See also
 St. Mark's Historic District

References

Further reading
 St. Mark's Church in-the-Bowery, Memorial of St. Mark's Church in the Bowery: containing an account of the services held to commemorate the one-hundredth anniversary of the dedication of the church on May 9, 1799. New York: Published by the Vestry, 1899

External links

 St. Mark's Church in-the-Bowery website
 Self-Guided Walking Tour
 The Villager: Dutch remember Stuyvesant in ‘Year of the Hudson’
 Lower East Side Preservation Initiative

Churches completed in 1799
20th-century Episcopal church buildings
Churches in Manhattan
Episcopal church buildings in New York City
New York City Designated Landmarks in Manhattan
1698 establishments in the Province of New York
Religious organizations established in the 1690s
East Village, Manhattan
Federal architecture in New York City
Gothic Revival church buildings in New York City
Properties of religious function on the National Register of Historic Places in Manhattan
Stone churches in New York City
18th-century Episcopal church buildings
John McComb Jr. buildings